The Winnipeg Challenger, currently sponsored as Winnipeg National Bank Challenger, is a professional tennis tournament played on outdoor hard courts. It is currently part of the ATP Challenger Tour and the ITF Women's Circuit. It has been held annually in Winnipeg, Manitoba, Canada, since 2013 for women and since 2016 for men.

Past finals

Men's singles

Women's singles

Men's doubles

Women's doubles

External links
Official website

 
ATP Challenger Tour
ITF Women's World Tennis Tour
Tennis tournaments in Canada
Hard court tennis tournaments
Sports competitions in Winnipeg
Tennis in Manitoba
Recurring sporting events established in 2013
2013 establishments in Manitoba